Diana Filipova (born 11 July 1971) is a Bulgarian badminton player. She competed in women's doubles at the 1992 Summer Olympics in Barcelona.

References

External links

1971 births
Living people
Bulgarian female badminton players
Olympic badminton players of Bulgaria
Badminton players at the 1992 Summer Olympics
20th-century Bulgarian women